Luke O'Dea (born 14 April 1993) is an Australian association football player who played two games as an attacking midfielder for Melbourne Victory in the A-League.

References

1993 births
Living people
Australian soccer players
Melbourne Victory FC players
Melbourne City FC players
A-League Men players
National Premier Leagues players
Association football midfielders
Australian people of Irish descent
People from Warragul
Sportsmen from Victoria (Australia)
Soccer players from Victoria (Australia)